SeatGeek is a mobile-focused ticket platform that enables users to buy and sell tickets for live sports, concerts, and theater events. SeatGeek allows both mobile app and desktop users to browse events, view interactive color-coded seatmaps, complete purchases, and receive electronic or print tickets. Originally launched as an aggregator of listings on the secondary ticketing market, the company now operates as both a secondary marketplace and primary ticket outlet for sports teams and live event venues.

The company's box office clients include the Dallas Cowboys, Arizona Cardinals, New Orleans Saints, Cleveland Cavaliers, New Orleans Pelicans, Major League Soccer, and the majority of clubs across the English Premier League, including Liverpool F.C. and Manchester City F.C. The platform also handles all of ticketing, including concerts, for large venues like AT&T Stadium and Rocket Mortage Fieldhouse. Theater clients include Jujamcyn Theaters, which operates five of the 41 Broadway houses in New York City, and Lloyd Webber Theatre Group in London.

History
SeatGeek was founded by Russell D'Souza and Jack Groetzinger at DreamIT Ventures, an early stage startup accelerator program in Philadelphia and launched in September 2009 at TechCrunch50 where it was named by VentureBeat and CNET as one of the top 5 companies from the conference. In May, the company had received $20,000 in seed funding from DreamIT Ventures.

In January 2010, SeatGeek received between $500,000 and $1 million in seed funding from Sunil Hirani, Mark Wachen, Arie Abecassis, Allen Levinson, Stage One Capital, Trisiras Group, and PKS Capital. In July, SeatGeek received a further $1 million in Series A funding from Founder Collective and NYC Seed. Later, in October 2010 the Series A investors invested an additional $550,000 into the company. In September, SeatGeek launched interactive seating charts for NFL stadiums.

In February 2011, SeatGeek announced a strategic investment from Ashton Kutcher and Guy Oseary through their fund A-Grade Investments. The level of financing was not disclosed. In August, SeatGeek announced that Yahoo! Sports had renewed its partnership with the company.

In December 2013, SeatGeek announced the acquisition of FanSnap, a competing ticket search engine. SeatGeek discontinued the FanSnap search engine and rolled it into their existing ticket search platform. In November, SeatGeek and Telecharge announced a partnership.

In March 2015, SeatGeek received $62 million in Series C funding led by Technology Crossover Ventures.

In July 2016, SeatGeek signed a deal with Major League Soccer to create an open ticketing network to let third-party websites sell tickets to MLS games. As part of the deal, SeatGeek also became the official ticketing partner of MLS team Sporting Kansas City. This made the club SeatGeek's first primary box office ticketing client.

In September 2017, Seattle Sounders FC announced that SeatGeek would be their official ticketing partner starting in 2018. Later that year, SeatGeek acquired Toptix, a company from Israel founded by Eli Dagan and Yehuda Yuval. SeatGeek also became the official primary ticketing partner of the New Orleans Saints and New Orleans Pelicans.

In 2018, SeatGeek was named one of Fast Company's Most Innovative Companies for Live Events. Also that year, SeatGeek announced that it had become a distribution partner of the NFL. The partnership allowed SeatGeek to sell verified NFL tickets through its marketplace. A month later, the company announced that it became the primary box office partner of the Dallas Cowboys. The company signed its first naming rights agreement when the live event venue in Bridgeview, Illinois - where the MLS's Chicago Fire played - renamed itself to SeatGeek Stadium. Shortly after, English Premier League team Manchester City announced an exclusive deal with SeatGeek to start selling the club's match tickets, for both its men's and women's teams, through SeatGeek's platform. Later that same year, the company integrated with Snapchat, allowing users to buy tickets within SnapChat's app. SeatGeek claimed that the integration was the first ticket-buying experience built into the Snapchat app. The company also partnered with Lyft on a feature that allows eventgoers to be dropped off closer to their actual seat. The company also hired James McClure as international general manager to expand the company's global reach.

In 2019, SeatGeek was once again named Fast Company's Most Innovative Companies for Live Events. Earlier that year, SeatGeek reached a deal with in-car vending company Cargo to offer exclusive ticket deals to ride-share passengers. In November, Marylebone Cricket Club appointed SeatGeek as the official ticketing partner of Lord's Cricket Ground in London. The partnership marked the company's first foray into the cricket market.

In January 2020, SeatGeek was named one of the "17th hottest brands in influencer marketing" by Insider.com. In March of that year, the English Premier Club Liverpool F.C. announced that they entered a primary ticketing partnership with SeatGeek. Later that year during the COVID-19 pandemic, the company announced that it was rolling out "SeatGeek Adapt", a suite of products to help teams deal with the challenge of maximizing revenue in an era where venues will likely be less than half full. The tools included a social distancing-based seating chart, timed entry, concessions and merchandise ordering, and personalized information to each ticketed fan at his or her specific seat.

In January 2021, Jujamcyn Theaters announced that it had reached an agreement with SeatGeek to handle all of its ticketing. The agreement marked SeatGeek's first Broadway partnership. In March, SeatGeek announced that it appointed former WNBA President Laurel J. Richie to its board of directors. In April, sports business news outlet Sportico reported that the company was in talks to roll out an NFT Prototype with NFL and NBA teams. That same month, SeatGeek released a proprietary platform called Rally which allowed fans to order food and beverage from their mobile device through the SeatGeek app. Additional integrations available through Rally included the ability to order a rideshare, view stadium venue guides and weather reports. The company rolled out Rally for the first time with the Cleveland Cavaliers and Rocket Mortage Fieldhouse where the team plays. Later that year, SeatGeek also integrated Rally's technology with MLS club Austin FC and Q2 Stadium. In July, SeatGeek signed its third NBA partner in the Brooklyn Nets when the company announced a partnership with the Nets parent company, Brooklyn Sports Entertainment Global. In addition to Nets games, SeatGeek took over ticketing for all Barclays Center events, including concerts. That fall, SeatGeek released SeatGeek Swaps, a feature that gives ticket holders the option to return their tickets for a credit up to 72 hours before an event. In October 2021, SeatGeek agreed to go public by merging with a special-purpose acquisition company, at a valuation of $1.35 billion.

In 2022, SeatGeek was named Fast Company's Most Innovative Companies for Live Events for the third time in its company's history.

On January 26, 2023, Billboard reported that after encountering multiple technical issues that resulted in lower than expected ticket sales for concerts, Brooklyn Sports Entertainment Global decided to end their partnership with SeatGeek early starting with the 2023 New York Liberty season, as well as for any events whose tickets went on sale on or after January 14, 2023, and return to having Ticketmaster handle ticketing for Barclays Center events.

FanSnap

FanSnap was an online search engine for live event tickets, based in Palo Alto, California. Founded in 2007, FanSnap aggregated event-level ticket data from event ticket providers.  FanSnap's search engine combined results from ticket issuers and various providers in the ticket resale industry including ticket resale marketplaces such as RazorGator, StubHub, TicketNetwork and eBay, as well as ticket brokers including Ace Ticket, AllShows.com, Barry's Tickets, Gold Coast Tickets and Las Vegas Tickets.

FanSnap did not sell tickets directly to its end-users.  Instead, it aggregated event-level ticket data from ticket providers, presented that data in response to user searches and directed users to third-party ticket providers for purchase. FanSnap generated revenue through cost per click and cost per action advertising based upon its referral of users to such third-party ticket providers.

FanSnap was acquired by NexTag in December 2011.

FanSnap was then acquired from Nextag/Wize Commerce by rival ticket search engine SeatGeek in November 2013 for an undisclosed sum. As part of the acquisition, the main FanSnap ticket search engine was discontinued and rolled into SeatGeek's existing ticket search offerings.

Technology and functioning
Initially launched as a ticket search engine, SeatGeek has grown from an aggregator to a primary ticket seller, instituting a platform that allows artists, sports teams, and others to sell tickets directly through the site. Tickets are sorted using the company's DealScore algorithm which finds the combination of best available price and seat location for a particular event. Historically, SeatGeek provided price forecast information in a similar manner to Farecast, an airline ticket aggregation and forecasting site purchased by Microsoft in 2008. SeatGeek has seen success in the mobile space, adopting Apple Pay to provide seamless purchase and payment.

SeatGeek's app offers customizable widgets and integrations with Lyft, Snapchat and other services through its proprietary platform called Rally. Features on Rally include an integration where fans can order mobile food and beverage from their seats, rideshares on Lyft, as well as see venue guides and weather reports before the event.

Awards and recognition
PC Magazine's "The Top 100 Web Sites of 2010".
Founders Russell D'Souza and Jack Groetzinger were named in Bloomberg BusinessWeek's "America's Best Young Entrepreneurs 2010."
Founders Jack Groetzinger and Russ D'Souza named to Business Insider's "The Silicon Alley 100: New York's Coolest Tech People In 2010"
SeatGeek was named one of Fast Company's Most Innovative Companies for Live Events in 2018, 2019, and 2022.
In 2019, SeatGeek was honored in the Crain's New York Business Fast 50, though it declined to disclose whether or not it was profitable.
In 2020, SeatGeek was named one of the "17th hottest brands in influencer marketing" by Insider.com.
SeatGeek Enterprise's Danielle Du Toit was named a 2020 GameChanger by Sports Business Journal in August 2020.

References

External links
 

Ticket sales companies
Online retailers of the United States
Internet properties established in 2009
Privately held companies based in New York City